WCWL-LP (103.5 FM) is a radio station broadcasting a religious format as an affiliate of Radio 74 Internationale. Licensed to Clearwater Lake, Wisconsin, United States, the station is currently owned by Northern Lakes Radio, Inc.

References

External links
 
 

CWL-LP
Vilas County, Wisconsin
CWL-LP
Radio 74 Internationale radio stations
2009 establishments in Wisconsin
Radio stations established in 2009